"Feel the Love" is a song by Icelandic singer Daði Freyr and Ásdís. It was released on January 1, 2021, through Awal Recordings. The song was written by Freyr, Ásdís, Jonas Shandel and Marcus Brosch, with production handled by the aforementioned artists.

Critical reception 
The piece described, among others Will Richards from NME website. Andy Wors of the Nordic Music Review called "Feel the Love" "a heart-warming song".

Credits and personnel 
Credits adapted from Tidal.

 Daði Freyr Pétursson production, songwriting, composition
 Ásdís María Viðarsdóttir songwriting, composition
 Marcus Brosch songwriting, composition
 Jonas Shandel songwriting, composition

Charts

Release history

References 

2021 songs
2021 singles